Bret Richardson (born 23 January 1971) is an Australian former professional tennis player.

Richardson, a Tasmanian, was ranked amongst the world's top 20 juniors. He competed on the professional tour in the early 1990s and reached a best world ranking of 361, with two main draw appearances at the ATP Tour's Queensland Open. In 1993 he featured in the men's doubles main draw of the Australian Open.

ATP Challenger finals

Doubles: 1 (0–1)

References

External links
 
 

1971 births
Living people
Australian male tennis players
Tennis people from Tasmania
Sportspeople from Launceston, Tasmania